Foster Peak is a  mountain summit located on the western border of Kootenay National Park. It is the highest point in the Vermilion Range, a sub-range of the Canadian Rockies of British Columbia, Canada. Its nearest higher peak is Mount Ball,  to the northeast. The mountain is part of what is known as The Rockwall. Floe Lake, southeast of the peak, is one of the beauty spots of Kootenay National Park. The area is accessible via the Floe Lake Trail and Rockwall Trail. The Rockwall Trail is a scenic 55 kilometre (34 mile) traverse of alpine passes, subalpine meadows, hanging glaciers, and limestone cliffs, in some places in excess of 900 metres (2953 feet) above the trail.

History
The mountain was named in 1913 after William Wasbrough Foster, who that same year made the first ascent of Mount Robson, the highest point in the Canadian Rockies. In 1925 Foster was part of the first ascent team that climbed Mount Logan, the highest point in Canada. The mountain's name was officially adopted in 1927 by the Geographical Names Board of Canada. The first ascent of Foster Peak was made in 1933 by Kate (Katie) Gardiner and Ken Jones, with Walter Feuz as guide.

Geology
Foster Peak is composed of Ottertail limestone, a sedimentary rock laid down during the Precambrian to Jurassic periods and pushed east and over the top of younger rock during the Laramide orogeny.

Climate
Based on the Köppen climate classification, Foster Peak is located in a subarctic climate with cold, snowy winters, and mild summers.

See also

Geology of the Rocky Mountains
Geography of British Columbia

References

External links
 Weather forecast: Foster Peak
 Parks Canada web site: Kootenay National Park

Three-thousanders of British Columbia
Canadian Rockies
Kootenay Land District